Dublin County West was a parliamentary constituency represented in Dáil Éireann, the lower house of the Irish parliament or Oireachtas from 1977 to 1981. The constituency elected 3 deputies (Teachtaí Dála, commonly known as TDs) to the Dáil, using proportional representation by means of the single transferable vote (PR-STV).

History and boundaries 
The constituency was created by the Electoral (Amendment) Act 1974, for the 1977 general election. It was abolished by the Electoral (Amendment) Act 1980. It became part of the Dublin West constituency, created for the 1981 general election.

It consisted of the following areas:
"In the administrative county of Dublin, the district electoral divisions of:
Blanchardstown, Castleknock, Clondalkin Number One, Clondalkin Number Two, Clonsilla, Lucan Number One, Lucan Number Two, Newcastle, Palmerston Number One, Palmerston Number Two, Rathcoole Saggart, Terenure Number One;
and, in the administrative county of Kildare, the district electoral divisions of:
Celbridge Donaghcumper, Leixlip, Maynooth, in the former Rural District of Celbridge No. 1;
and the following wards in the county borough of Dublin:
Ballyfermot H, Crumlin F."

TDs

1977 general election

See also 
Dáil constituencies
Politics of the Republic of Ireland
Historic Dáil constituencies
Elections in the Republic of Ireland

References

External links 
Oireachtas Members Database

Dáil constituencies in County Dublin (historic)
1977 establishments in Ireland
1981 disestablishments in Ireland
Constituencies established in 1977
Constituencies disestablished in 1981